Siegfried Philippi, born Siegfried Salomon Philipp (31 July 1871 – 29 February 1936) was a German screenwriter and film director.

Selected filmography
 Mountain Air (1917)
 Madeleine (1919)
 Dancer of Death (1920)
 The Black Spider (1921)
 Sunken Worlds (1922)
 Playing with Destiny (1924)
 The Creature (1924)
 Letters Which Never Reached Him (1925)
 The Mill at Sanssouci (1926)
 That Was Heidelberg on Summer Nights (1927)
 Circle of Lovers (1927)
 On the Banks of the River Weser (1927)
 Autumn on the Rhine (1928)
 Today I Was With Frieda (1928)
 The Lord of the Tax Office (1929)
 The Lady from Argentina (1928)
 Beware of Loose Women (1929)

References

Bibliography
 Grange, William. Cultural Chronicle of the Weimar Republic. Scarecrow Press, 2008.
 Weniger, Kay. Das große Personenlexikon des Films. Schwarzkopf & Schwarzkopf 2001.

External links

1871 births
1936 deaths
Film people from Schleswig-Holstein
People from Lübeck